Theodor Illek (born in 1984, Kranj, Slovenia), is a poet, prose writer, visual artist, and playwright who focuses on the themes of migration, religion, and the issue of connecting art with science. He is a doctor in veterinarian medicine by training. Since 2007, he has been presenting his work both in Slovenia and abroad, namely in Russia, France, Germany, Israel, Austria, the Czech Republic, Bosnia and Herzegovina, Serbia, as the author of independent and group experimental projects implemented in the framework of a contemporary art society called Aggressive Theatre. He is also a co-founder of the same society and its president. Illek's poetry is published in the notable Slovenian (Nova revija, Sodobnost, Literatura, Dialogi, Poetikon, Lirikon, Mentor, etc.) and foreign magazines (Le Rouge sang, Rukopisi 32 (Belgrade, Serbia), Van kutije – an anthology of modern poetry (Podgorica; Montenegro), Republika poezije (Sarajevo, Bosnia and Herzegovina), Euroorientacije (Sarajevo, Bosnia and Herzegovina), DeZopilant (France)). His first work of poetry, called Sinapse, for which he received a scholarship from a fund for gifted high-school and university students, was published in 2003. 

Illek lives and works in Vienna.

Education 

  2011 Veterinary Faculty Ljubljana (Doctor of Veterinary Medicine)
  2003 Gimnazija Bežigrad, Ljubljana

Solo exhibitions 

  2011 Where is God?, Galery Tir, Nova Gorica
  2010 Moustrap II, IRIU Institut, Ljubljana
 2010 Mobile Mosque, Gallery Studio8, Ljubljana
  2009 Acute Art, Mala Gallery, Ljubljana
  2009 Südbahnhof Poesie, Railway station, Vienna
  2008 Desperance, Concentration camp, Goli Otok
  2008 For Whom the Phone Rings? International art festival Ana desetnica, Ljubljana
 2007 A Poet in Paris, Cankarjev Dom, Ljubljana
  2007 Equivalentis, Modern Gallery, Ljubljana

Group projects 

 2009 The birth of poetry, European Slam poetry festival, Berlin
 2009 Stone on Stone,  Concentration camp, Goli Otok
  2008 Gen 80 Kolovrat Theatre, Ljubljana
  2008 How to destroy a gallery, Son:Da, Maribor
  2007 Najin princ,  David Luzar's film, Kamnik
  2005 Jutro 1, Memorial park, Ljubljana

Theatre 

  2003 Non Si Paga! Non Si Paga!, Teater na robu, Ljubljana,
  2004 Premik, Dance Theatre Ljubljana, Ljubljana
  2008 Seventeen moments of spring, International art festival Ana desetnica, Ljubljana

Bibliography 

  2010 The Poetry of an Experiment, Aggressive Theatre
  2003 Sinapse, poetry collection, Gimnazija bezigrad

Translations 

  2009 Kruhovec (Breadfruit), Malika Booker, Mouthmark, 2007

Publications 

  2012 Conceit Magazine, San Francisco CA
 2012 Amulet, San Francisco CA
  2011 DeZopilant, Reims France
 2010 AmphibiUs, Washington DC
  2010 Sodobnost, Ljubljana
  2010 Van Kutije Anthology, Podgorica
  2010 Le Rouge sang, Reims
  2010 Katedra, Ljubljana
  2009 Literatura, Ljubljana
  2009 Mlade rime, Ljubljana
  2009 Lirikon, Velenika
  2009 Rukopisi 32, Beograd
  2009 Literarni nokturno, RTV Slo
  2009 Republika poezije, Sarajevo
  2009 Dialogi, Zalozba Obzorja
  2008 Nova Revija, Ljubljana
  2008 Vpogled, Zalec
  2008 Mentor, Ljubljana
  2008 Ructus, Ljubljana
  2007 Poetikon, Ljubljana
  2007 Literarni nokturno, RTV Slo
  2003 Lit, Gimnazija Bezigrad

Grants and awards 

 2010 First prize for poetry on international poetry competition "Sledi - Tracce" Trieste, Italy
  2010 First prize for the collection of poetry NY on Ekslibris publishing house competition
 2009 Nomination for Herberstein / Lirikon gold for best contemporary translation of poetry into Slovenian (Breadfruit)
  2008 Chosen between 21 best Slovenian poets by poetry magazine Lirikon
  2004 Stipendium for poetry collection Sinapse from found for talented students of municipality Domžale

Sources
     tir.mostovna.com
     agrressive-theatre.com
     
     celesteprize.com
     :sl:Theodor Illek
     

1984 births
Living people
Slovenian poets
Slovenian male poets
Slovenian dramatists and playwrights
Artists from Kranj
University of Ljubljana alumni
Writers from Kranj